The 2002 Cadillac American Le Mans Challenge was the ninth round of the 2002 American Le Mans Series season.  It took place on a temporary street circuit in Miami, Florida, on October 5, 2002.

Official results
Class winners in bold.

Statistics
 Pole Position - #1 Audi Sport North America - 1:03.873
 Fastest Lap - #2 Audi Sport North America - 1:05.620
 Distance - 272.323 km
 Average Speed - 98.392 km/h

External links
 
 World Sports Racing Prototypes - Race Results

A
Grand Prix Americas
American Le Mans Challenge
American Le Mans Challenge